Dr. F. Lalnunmawia  is a Mizo National Front politician from Mizoram and resides at Samtlang, Aizawl, Mizoram. He has been elected to the Mizoram Legislative Assembly from Aizawl South 3 Constituency. He was associate professor in Mizoram University prior to his election to the Mizoram Legislative Assembly.

Education
He has completed his M.A. in NEHU, Shillong and his Ph.D. from Mizoram University in Botany.

References

Mizoram politicians
People from Aizawl district
Living people
Mizo people
North-Eastern Hill University alumni
1973 births
Mizoram MLAs 2018–2023
Mizo National Front politicians